The clavecin électrique (or clavessin électrique) was a musical instrument invented in 1759 by Jean-Baptiste Thillaie Delaborde, a French Jesuit priest. It is the earliest surviving electric-powered musical instrument, antedated only by the Denis d'or, which is only known from written accounts.

Delaborde described the instrument in his 1761 publication, Le clavessin électrique. The mechanism was based on a contemporary warning-bell device, and the instrument was essentially an electric carillon. A number of bells, two for each pitch, hang from iron bars along with their clappers (one for each pair). A globe generator charged the prime conductor and the iron bars. The musician pressed a key and one of the bells of the corresponding pair was grounded, cut off from the charge source. The clapper then oscillated between the grounded and the charged bells, producing the desired tone.

The somewhat inappropriate choice of the instrument's name was defended by Delaborde, who claimed that it was far superior to a carillon. He also mentioned that during a performance in a dark room, the listener's "eyes are agreeably surprised by the brilliant sparks" that were produced by the instrument. The press and the public admired the innovative machine, but it was not developed further. The model Delaborde himself built survives, and is kept at the Bibliothèque nationale de France in Paris.

References
 Schiffer, Michael; Hollenback, Kasy; and Bell, Carrie. 2003. Draw the Lightning Down: Benjamin Franklin and Electrical Technology In the Age of Enlightenment. University of California Press.

External links
 Audio demo and photographs of a contemporary reconstruction of the clavecin électrique
 Clavecin électrique at '120 Years of Electronic Music'

Electronic musical instruments
Electrostatics
French inventions